is a Japanese baseball player who is currently a free agent. He has played in Nippon Professional Baseball (NPB) for the Hiroshima Toyo Carp.

Career

On April 26, 2008, Kokubo made his NPB debut.

On December 2, 2020, he become free agent.

References

External links

 NPB.com

1985 births
Living people
Aoyama Gakuin University alumni
Baseball people from Nara Prefecture
Chiba Lotte Marines players
Hiroshima Toyo Carp players
Japanese baseball players
Nippon Professional Baseball infielders
Japanese baseball coaches
Nippon Professional Baseball coaches